Spas Dzhurov (28 November 1944 – 12 April 2018) was a Bulgarian athlete. He competed in the men's decathlon at the 1968 Summer Olympics.

References

1944 births
2018 deaths
Athletes (track and field) at the 1968 Summer Olympics
Bulgarian decathletes
Olympic athletes of Bulgaria
Sportspeople from Sofia